Les Misérables is a 1995 film written, produced and directed by Claude Lelouch. Set in France during the first half of the 20th century, the film concerns a poor and illiterate man named Henri Fortin (Jean-Paul Belmondo) who is introduced to Victor Hugo's classic 1862 novel Les Misérables and begins to see parallels to his own life. The film won the 1995 Golden Globe Award for Best Foreign Language Film.

Plot
As the film opens, Henri's father, a chauffeur also named Henri, is falsely accused of having murdered his boss. During his trial and imprisonment, Henri's mother finds a job in a tavern on a Normandy beach. There Henri sees a film adaptation of Les Misérables. His father dies attempting to escape from prison, and upon hearing the news Henri's mother commits suicide. Henri grows up an orphan and learns boxing.

The film next takes up the story of Elisa, a ballerina, and André Ziman, a young Jewish journalist and law student. They meet following a performance of a ballet based on Les Misérables. Later, during World War II, André and Elisa, now married, and their daughter Salomé attempt to cross the Swiss border to escape the Nazis. They encounter Henri, who owns a moving company, and they discuss the Hugo novel. The Zimans entrust Salomé to Henri and enroll her in a Catholic convent school. André and Elisa are ambushed while trying to cross the frontier. Elisa is arrested and André wounded. Farmers who find him give him shelter.

The members of a local gang and Henri join the French Resistance, but the gang members take advantage of their anti-Nazi attacks to steal from local houses. Elisa and other women are forced to entertain the Nazi occupiers. She is sent to a concentration camp for being defiant. After staging an attack on a train transporting funds for the Vichy government, Henri and his mates travel to Normandy to visit the tavern where he lived as a child. The D-Day invasion is launched the next day and Henri supports the Allied forces when they conquer the beach. In the process he saves the life of the tavern owner's son Marius.

At the war's end, Henri accepts an offer to run a seaside camp in Normandy. There he receives a letter from Salomé, who has no way of contacting her family. He takes her with him to the resort, which he names Chez Jean Valjean. Elisa, having survived a Nazi concentration camp in German-occupied Poland, joins them later.

A former Vichy police agent accuses Henri of abetting the gang's activities during the war and of robbing and burning a train. He is imprisoned to await trial. Meanwhile André's one-time rescuer is holding him captive, hoping to live off his bank account. The farmer has told André that the American D-Day invasion failed and the Nazis now rule the world. With evident reluctance, the farmer's wife supports her husband in these lies until he attempts to poison André. Then she shoots her husband before he can feed André the poisoned soup. As she checks to see if her husband is dead, he grabs her and chokes her to death. André escapes from his cellar prison on a bad leg and emerges to find the farmer couple dead and a liberated Europe. He rejoins his wife and daughter at Chez Jean Valjean and then represents Henri at his trial and wins his acquittal.

As the film ends, Henri, now the mayor, presides at the civil marriage of Salomé and Marius in the presence of André and Elisa and the mother superior of the school that sheltered Salomé. André Ziman quotes Victor Hugo: "The best of our lives is yet to come."

Cast 
 Jean-Paul Belmondo as Leopold/Henri Fortin/Henri's father (also named Henri Fortin)
 Michel Boujenah as André Ziman
 Alessandra Martines as Elisa Ziman
 Salomé Lelouch as Salomé Ziman, child
 Margot Abascal as Salomé Ziman, adult
 Annie Girardot as Madame Thénardier
 Philippe Léotard as Thénardier
 Clémentine Célarié as Catherine
 Philippe Khorsand as Policeman
 Ticky Holgado as Nice Street Urchin
 William Leymergie as Toureiffel
 Jean Marais as Msgr. Myriel
 Micheline Presle as Mother Superior
 Sylvie Joly as the Innkeeper
 Daniel Toscan du Plantier as Count de Villeneuve
 Michaël Cohen as Marius
 Jacques Boudet as Doctor
 Robert Hossein as Ceremony Master
 Darry Cowl as Bookseller
 Antoine Duléry as Crazy Street Urchin
 Jacques Gamblin as Church Attendant
 Joseph Malerba as The pumpman
 Pierre Vernier as Prison Director
 Nicolas Vogel as Le général de Verdun
In the film within the film
 Jean-Paul Belmondo as Jean Valjean
 Rufus as Monsieur Thénardier
 Nicole Croisille as Mme. Thénardier
 Clémentine Célarié as Fantine
 Philippe Khorsand as Javert

Reception
The film opened at number one at the French box office with a gross of 8,510,740 Francs ($1.7 million) for the week. 
The film received positive reviews from critics with a score of 80% on Rotten Tomatoes. Roger Ebert wrote he liked this film's "expansive freedom and (the) energy of its storytelling". The Los Angeles Times called it "a spectacular-looking film" that "eventually becomes needlessly drawn-out", and added: "the cast is staunch...but Belmondo...easily walks away with the picture." Variety said it was the "mightiest of Lelouch’s humanist hymns", and Belmondo "gives one of the finest perfs of his career". Janet Maslin, who reviewed the film for The New York Times, meanwhile complained about "odd variations on Hugo's themes."

Accolades
The film won the 1995 Golden Globe Award for Best Foreign Language Film and Annie Girardot won the 1996 César Award for Best Supporting Actress.

See also
 Adaptations of Les Misérables

References

External links

Les Miserables at Le Film Guide
 Les Misérables (1995) at Films de France

1995 films
Films based on Les Misérables
French war drama films
French World War II films
Films directed by Claude Lelouch
Films scored by Michel Legrand
Films scored by Francis Lai
Best Foreign Language Film Golden Globe winners
1990s French films